Mary Kiani's second solo single was the Double AA Side release "I Give It All to You"/"I Imagine". While the first was supplied to radio stations with only two almost identical versions, the second was remixed in a variety of styles, as with all her singles, notably by Steve Rodway of Motiv8. A video for "I Give It All to You" was also released.

Track listings and formats
These are the main formats and track listings of the single release of Mary Kiani's "I Give It All to You / I Imagine".

1995 songs
1995 singles
Mary Kiani songs
Songs written by Albert Hammond
Songs written by Steve DuBerry